Chen Liang may refer to:

Chen Kung-Liang (born 1964),  Taiwanese modern pentathlete
Liang Chen (born 1989), Chinese tennis player